Esmerling de Jesús Vásquez (born November 7, 1983) is a Dominican former professional baseball pitcher. He has played in Major League Baseball (MLB) for the Arizona Diamondbacks and Minnesota Twins and in Nippon Professional Baseball (NPB) for the Saitama Seibu Lions.

Career

Arizona Diamondbacks
Vásquez signed as an undrafted free agent in 2003 by the Arizona Diamondbacks.

Vásquez played for the Double-A Mobile BayBears in 2007. He started in all 29 games he played in and went 10-6 with a 2.99 ERA. Following the season, the Diamondbacks named Vásquez as their minor league pitcher of the year. His contract was purchased on November 20, 2007.

Vásquez was called up to the Diamondbacks on April 26, 2009, and made his Major League debut later that day.

He was demoted to Triple A Reno on April 17, 2010 to make room for Kris Benson but was recalled 2 days later after Conor Jackson was injured

On Memorial Day, 2010, as a member of one of the worst bullpens in MLB history, Vasquez committed a balk in the bottom of the ninth against the Dodgers, allowing Casey Blake to score the winning run. The event was known as a "balk-off".

In his career with the Diamondbacks, Vásquez went 5-10 with a 4.66 ERA in 141 games with a 1.496 WHIP

Minnesota Twins
Vásquez was claimed off waivers by the Minnesota Twins on September 27, 2011. He did not pitch for the Twins that year.

Vásquez spent most of 2012 with Triple-A Rochester, where he went 9-6 with a 2.78 ERA in 31 games, 8 of them starts. Called up on September 1, Vásquez went 0-2 with a 5.68 in 6 starts for the Twins. On November 5, Vásquez signed a minor league deal with the Twins.

On June 23, 2013, the Twins released Vásquez.

EDA Rhinos
Vasquez signed with the EDA Rhinos of the Chinese Professional Baseball League for the 2014 season.

Saitama Seibu Lions
Vasquez signed with the Saitama Seibu Lions of Nippon Professional Baseball for the 2015 season.

Algodoneros de Unión Laguna
On July 19, 2018, Vasquez signed with the Algodoneros de Unión Laguna of the Mexican Baseball League.

Texas Rangers
On March 10, 2019, Vasquez signed a minor league deal with the Texas Rangers. He became a free agent following the 2019 season. On March 14, 2020, Vásquez re-signed to a minor league deal with the Rangers. He became a free agent on November 2, 2020.

References

External links

1983 births
Living people
Águilas de Mexicali players
Algodoneros de Unión Laguna players
Arizona Diamondbacks players
Dominican Republic expatriate baseball players in Japan
Dominican Republic expatriate baseball players in Mexico
Dominican Republic expatriate baseball players in Taiwan
Dominican Republic expatriate baseball players in the United States
EDA Rhinos players
Estrellas Orientales players
Frisco RoughRiders players
Lancaster Barnstormers players
Lancaster JetHawks players
Major League Baseball pitchers
Major League Baseball players from the Dominican Republic
Mexican League baseball pitchers
Minnesota Twins players
Missoula Osprey players
Mobile BayBears players
Nashville Sounds players
Nippon Professional Baseball pitchers
Reno Aces players
Rochester Red Wings players
Saitama Seibu Lions players
Scottsdale Scorpions players
South Bend Silver Hawks players
Tiburones de La Guaira players
Tucson Sidewinders players
Yakima Bears players
Dominican Republic expatriate baseball players in Venezuela